Parrot's Drumble is a nature reserve of the Staffordshire Wildlife Trust.

Description
It is an ancient woodland, the area having been woodland for more than 400 years. It was once owned by a family named Parrot, and a "drumble" is a local word for a stream running through a wooded valley.

There are old mineworkings in the area, from which iron oxide leaches, giving the stream a reddish colour.

There is a walking trail through the wood, where there is oak, hazel, birch, rowan and ash; near the stream there is willow and alder. Woodland plants include dog's mercury, yellow archangel and wood-sorrel, and in the spring there are notable displays of bluebells. Birds to be seen include great spotted woodpecker, lesser spotted woodpecker, nuthatch and treecreeper.

Parrots Drumble is the source of the River Waldron which flows through Staffordshire and Cheshire until it meets the River Weaver near Nantwich.

References

Nature reserves in Staffordshire
Forests and woodlands of Staffordshire
Ancient woods in England